Abida secale is a species of small air-breathing land snail, a terrestrial pulmonate gastropod mollusc in the family Chondrinidae.

Distribution
The distribution of this species is Western European and Alpine regions.

This species is known to occur in a number of Western European countries and islands including:
 Great Britain: England
 Sardinia
 Switzerland
 and other areas

Habitat
This species only occurs on calcareous rocks.

Subspecies
This species has a number of named subspecies:
 Abida secale secale
 Abida secale cadiensis Gittenberger, 1973
 Abida secale lilietensis (Bofill, 1886)
 Abida secale margaridae Bech, 1988
 Abida secale branopsis (Bofill, 1886)
 Abida secale vilellai Kokshoorn & Gittenberger, 2010
 Abida secale peteri Kokshoorn & Gittenberger, 2010
 Abida secale merijni Kokshoorn & Gittenberger, 2010
 Abida secale ionicae Kokshoorn & Gittenberger, 2010

References

External links 

 Abida secale at AnimalBase

Chondrinidae
Gastropods described in 1801
Gastropods of Europe